Saint-Vran (Gallo: Saent-Veran) is a commune in the Côtes-d'Armor department of Brittany in northwestern France.

Geography
The Meu river has its source in the commune.

Population

Inhabitants of Saint-Vran are called brennoviens in French.

See also
Communes of the Côtes-d'Armor department

References
Official website

Communes of Côtes-d'Armor